The discography for the American bluegrass musician Bill Monroe includes a selection of compilation albums. No duplicates are listed.

Discography

78/45 RPM singles

Studio albums

Compilations

Live albums

References
 Bill Monroe - The Essential 1945-1949, Booklet, Columbia C2K 52478
 Bill Monroe - Blue Grass 1950-1958, Booklet, Bear Family Records BCD 15423
 Bill Monroe - Blue Grass 1959-1969, Booklet, Bear Family Records BCD 15529
 Bill Monroe - Blue Grass 1970-1979, Booklet, Bear Family Records BCD 15606
 Bluegrass Discography
 The Online Discographical Project

 
Country music discographies
Discographies of American artists
Discography